Heikki Repo (26 April 1871, Parikkala - 30 July 1931) was a Finnish farmer, bank director and politician. He was a member of the Parliament of Finland, representing the Finnish Party from 1907 to 1908, from 1909 to 1911 and from 1916 to 1917 and the National Coalition Party in 1919.

References

1871 births
1931 deaths
People from Parikkala
People from Viipuri Province (Grand Duchy of Finland)
Finnish Lutherans
Finnish Party politicians
National Coalition Party politicians
Members of the Parliament of Finland (1907–08)
Members of the Parliament of Finland (1909–10)
Members of the Parliament of Finland (1910–11)
Members of the Parliament of Finland (1916–17)
Members of the Parliament of Finland (1917–19)